The 2001-02 Buffalo Sabres season was the 32nd for the National Hockey League franchise that was established on May 22, 1970. The Sabres finished in 5th place in the Northeast Division and failed to qualify for the playoffs for the first time since 1996.

Offseason
The Sabres traded both of their stars, Mike Peca, their former captain and Dominik Hasek in the offseason. Peca was sent to the Islanders for Tim Connolly and Taylor Pyatt. Forward Stu Barnes was named team captain.

Regular season
On October 7, 2001 the Sabres played the New York Rangers in the first pro sports game played in Manhattan after the September 11 attacks. In the game both teams wore special one time jerseys with "New York" written diagonally on the front of the jersey. The jerseys were later auctioned off to raise money for the 9/11 victims fund. The Sabres lost the game 5–4 in overtime.

Final standings

Schedule and results

|-  style="text-align:center; background:#fbb;"
|1||L||October 4, 2001||1–2 || style="text-align:left;"|  Atlanta Thrashers (2001–02) ||0–1–0–0 || 
|-  style="text-align:center; background:#cfc;"
|2||W||October 6, 2001||3–2 || style="text-align:left;"|  Ottawa Senators (2001–02) ||1–1–0–0 || 
|-  style="text-align:center; background:#FF6F6F;"
|3||OTL||October 7, 2001||4–5 OT|| style="text-align:left;"| @ New York Rangers (2001–02) ||1–1–0–1 || 
|-  style="text-align:center; background:#cfc;"
|4||W||October 10, 2001||2–1 || style="text-align:left;"|  Philadelphia Flyers (2001–02) ||2–1–0–1 || 
|-  style="text-align:center; background:#fbb;"
|5||L||October 12, 2001||2–4 || style="text-align:left;"| @ Detroit Red Wings (2001–02) ||2–2–0–1 || 
|-  style="text-align:center; background:#cfc;"
|6||W||October 14, 2001||4–1 || style="text-align:left;"|  Pittsburgh Penguins (2001–02) ||3–2–0–1 || 
|- style="text-align:center;"
|7||T||October 16, 2001||3–3 OT|| style="text-align:left;"|  Nashville Predators (2001–02) ||3–2–1–1 || 
|-  style="text-align:center; background:#fbb;"
|8||L||October 19, 2001||1–3 || style="text-align:left;"|  Columbus Blue Jackets (2001–02) ||3–3–1–1 || 
|-  style="text-align:center; background:#cfc;"
|9||W||October 20, 2001||3–1 || style="text-align:left;"| @ Montreal Canadiens (2001–02) ||4–3–1–1 || 
|-  style="text-align:center; background:#cfc;"
|10||W||October 23, 2001||4–1 || style="text-align:left;"|  San Jose Sharks (2001–02) ||5–3–1–1 || 
|-  style="text-align:center; background:#fbb;"
|11||L||October 26, 2001||2–5 || style="text-align:left;"|  Montreal Canadiens (2001–02) ||5–4–1–1 || 
|-  style="text-align:center; background:#fbb;"
|12||L||October 27, 2001||1–3 || style="text-align:left;"| @ New Jersey Devils (2001–02) ||5–5–1–1 || 
|-  style="text-align:center; background:#fbb;"
|13||L||October 30, 2001||2–3 || style="text-align:left;"|  Phoenix Coyotes (2001–02) ||5–6–1–1 || 
|-

|-  style="text-align:center; background:#cfc;"
|14||W||November 2, 2001||4–1 || style="text-align:left;"|  Tampa Bay Lightning (2001–02) ||6–6–1–1 || 
|-  style="text-align:center; background:#fbb;"
|15||L||November 3, 2001||0–3 || style="text-align:left;"| @ Ottawa Senators (2001–02) ||6–7–1–1 || 
|-  style="text-align:center; background:#cfc;"
|16||W||November 8, 2001||8–0 || style="text-align:left;"|  Atlanta Thrashers (2001–02) ||7–7–1–1 || 
|-  style="text-align:center; background:#fbb;"
|17||L||November 10, 2001||2–4 || style="text-align:left;"|  New York Rangers (2001–02) ||7–8–1–1 || 
|-  style="text-align:center; background:#cfc;"
|18||W||November 12, 2001||5–3 || style="text-align:left;"| @ Florida Panthers (2001–02) ||8–8–1–1 || 
|-  style="text-align:center; background:#fbb;"
|19||L||November 13, 2001||1–4 || style="text-align:left;"| @ Nashville Predators (2001–02) ||8–9–1–1 || 
|-  style="text-align:center; background:#fbb;"
|20||L||November 16, 2001||0–2 || style="text-align:left;"|  Florida Panthers (2001–02) ||8–10–1–1 || 
|-  style="text-align:center; background:#fbb;"
|21||L||November 17, 2001||1–3 || style="text-align:left;"| @ Boston Bruins (2001–02) ||8–11–1–1 || 
|-  style="text-align:center; background:#fbb;"
|22||L||November 19, 2001||2–3 || style="text-align:left;"| @ Atlanta Thrashers (2001–02) ||8–12–1–1 || 
|-  style="text-align:center; background:#cfc;"
|23||W||November 21, 2001||4–2 || style="text-align:left;"|  Toronto Maple Leafs (2001–02) ||9–12–1–1 || 
|-  style="text-align:center; background:#cfc;"
|24||W||November 23, 2001||5–2 || style="text-align:left;"|  Calgary Flames (2001–02) ||10–12–1–1 || 
|-  style="text-align:center; background:#fbb;"
|25||L||November 24, 2001||1–3 || style="text-align:left;"| @ Pittsburgh Penguins (2001–02) ||10–13–1–1 || 
|- style="text-align:center;"
|26||T||November 27, 2001||2–2 OT|| style="text-align:left;"|  New York Rangers (2001–02) ||10–13–2–1 || 
|-  style="text-align:center; background:#cfc;"
|27||W||November 28, 2001||5–2 || style="text-align:left;"| @ Washington Capitals (2001–02) ||11–13–2–1 || 
|-

|-  style="text-align:center; background:#cfc;"
|28||W||December 1, 2001||4–2 || style="text-align:left;"| @ New York Islanders (2001–02) ||12–13–2–1 || 
|-  style="text-align:center; background:#cfc;"
|29||W||December 4, 2001||4–2 || style="text-align:left;"| @ Carolina Hurricanes (2001–02) ||13–13–2–1 || 
|-  style="text-align:center; background:#fbb;"
|30||L||December 7, 2001||1–4 || style="text-align:left;"|  Colorado Avalanche (2001–02) ||13–14–2–1 || 
|-  style="text-align:center; background:#fbb;"
|31||L||December 8, 2001||2–4 || style="text-align:left;"| @ Boston Bruins (2001–02) ||13–15–2–1 || 
|-  style="text-align:center; background:#fbb;"
|32||L||December 12, 2001||3–4 || style="text-align:left;"| @ Dallas Stars (2001–02) ||13–16–2–1 || 
|-  style="text-align:center; background:#cfc;"
|33||W||December 14, 2001||3–2 OT|| style="text-align:left;"|  Carolina Hurricanes (2001–02) ||14–16–2–1 || 
|-  style="text-align:center; background:#fbb;"
|34||L||December 15, 2001||2–4 || style="text-align:left;"| @ New York Rangers (2001–02) ||14–17–2–1 || 
|-  style="text-align:center; background:#fbb;"
|35||L||December 19, 2001||5–6 || style="text-align:left;"|  Chicago Blackhawks (2001–02) ||14–18–2–1 || 
|- style="text-align:center;"
|36||T||December 21, 2001||3–3 OT|| style="text-align:left;"|  Toronto Maple Leafs (2001–02) ||14–18–3–1 || 
|-  style="text-align:center; background:#fbb;"
|37||L||December 22, 2001||2–3 || style="text-align:left;"| @ Toronto Maple Leafs (2001–02) ||14–19–3–1 || 
|-  style="text-align:center; background:#cfc;"
|38||W||December 26, 2001||3–1 || style="text-align:left;"|  Montreal Canadiens (2001–02) ||15–19–3–1 || 
|- style="text-align:center;"
|39||T||December 29, 2001||2–2 OT|| style="text-align:left;"| @ Columbus Blue Jackets (2001–02) ||15–19–4–1 || 
|-  style="text-align:center; background:#fbb;"
|40||L||December 31, 2001||4–5 || style="text-align:left;"|  Carolina Hurricanes (2001–02) ||15–20–4–1 || 
|-

|-  style="text-align:center; background:#fbb;"
|41||L||January 3, 2002||1–3 || style="text-align:left;"| @ Calgary Flames (2001–02) ||15–21–4–1 || 
|-  style="text-align:center; background:#cfc;"
|42||W||January 6, 2002||4–1 || style="text-align:left;"| @ Minnesota Wild (2001–02) ||16–21–4–1 || 
|-  style="text-align:center; background:#cfc;"
|43||W||January 8, 2002||3–2 || style="text-align:left;"|  Vancouver Canucks (2001–02) ||17–21–4–1 || 
|-  style="text-align:center; background:#fbb;"
|44||L||January 10, 2002||0–2 || style="text-align:left;"|  Pittsburgh Penguins (2001–02) ||17–22–4–1 || 
|-  style="text-align:center; background:#cfc;"
|45||W||January 12, 2002||2–1 || style="text-align:left;"|  New Jersey Devils (2001–02) ||18–22–4–1 || 
|-  style="text-align:center; background:#cfc;"
|46||W||January 16, 2002||3–1 || style="text-align:left;"| @ Mighty Ducks of Anaheim (2001–02) ||19–22–4–1 || 
|-  style="text-align:center; background:#fbb;"
|47||L||January 17, 2002||2–4 || style="text-align:left;"| @ Los Angeles Kings (2001–02) ||19–23–4–1 || 
|-  style="text-align:center; background:#cfc;"
|48||W||January 19, 2002||3–1 || style="text-align:left;"| @ Phoenix Coyotes (2001–02) ||20–23–4–1 || 
|-  style="text-align:center; background:#fbb;"
|49||L||January 21, 2002||2–3 || style="text-align:left;"| @ Colorado Avalanche (2001–02) ||20–24–4–1 || 
|-  style="text-align:center; background:#fbb;"
|50||L||January 23, 2002||2–5 || style="text-align:left;"|  St. Louis Blues (2001–02) ||20–25–4–1 || 
|-  style="text-align:center; background:#cfc;"
|51||W||January 25, 2002||4–1 || style="text-align:left;"|  Tampa Bay Lightning (2001–02) ||21–25–4–1 || 
|-  style="text-align:center; background:#cfc;"
|52||W||January 27, 2002||3–2 OT|| style="text-align:left;"| @ Washington Capitals (2001–02) ||22–25–4–1 || 
|- style="text-align:center;"
|53||T||January 29, 2002||2–2 OT|| style="text-align:left;"| @ Carolina Hurricanes (2001–02) ||22–25–5–1 || 
|-

|- style="text-align:center;"
|54||T||February 5, 2002||2–2 OT|| style="text-align:left;"| @ Boston Bruins (2001–02) ||22–25–6–1 || 
|-  style="text-align:center; background:#cfc;"
|55||W||February 8, 2002||3–2 OT|| style="text-align:left;"|  Ottawa Senators (2001–02) ||23–25–6–1 || 
|-  style="text-align:center; background:#fbb;"
|56||L||February 10, 2002||1–4 || style="text-align:left;"| @ New Jersey Devils (2001–02) ||23–26–6–1 || 
|- style="text-align:center;"
|57||T||February 12, 2002||2–2 OT|| style="text-align:left;"|  New Jersey Devils (2001–02) ||23–26–7–1 || 
|-  style="text-align:center; background:#fbb;"
|58||L||February 26, 2002||1–2 || style="text-align:left;"| @ Atlanta Thrashers (2001–02) ||23–27–7–1 || 
|-

|-  style="text-align:center; background:#cfc;"
|59||W||March 1, 2002||4–3 || style="text-align:left;"|  Boston Bruins (2001–02) ||24–27–7–1 || 
|- style="text-align:center;"
|60||T||March 2, 2002||3–3 OT|| style="text-align:left;"| @ Toronto Maple Leafs (2001–02) ||24–27–8–1 || 
|-  style="text-align:center; background:#fbb;"
|61||L||March 4, 2002||0–3 || style="text-align:left;"|  Edmonton Oilers (2001–02) ||24–28–8–1 || 
|-  style="text-align:center; background:#cfc;"
|62||W||March 7, 2002||5–0 || style="text-align:left;"| @ New York Islanders (2001–02) ||25–28–8–1 || 
|-  style="text-align:center; background:#cfc;"
|63||W||March 8, 2002||3–0 || style="text-align:left;"|  Montreal Canadiens (2001–02) ||26–28–8–1 || 
|-  style="text-align:center; background:#cfc;"
|64||W||March 10, 2002||5–1 || style="text-align:left;"|  Detroit Red Wings (2001–02) ||27–28–8–1 || 
|-  style="text-align:center; background:#fbb;"
|65||L||March 12, 2002||0–3 || style="text-align:left;"|  New York Islanders (2001–02) ||27–29–8–1 || 
|-  style="text-align:center; background:#cfc;"
|66||W||March 14, 2002||3–1 || style="text-align:left;"| @ Philadelphia Flyers (2001–02) ||28–29–8–1 || 
|-  style="text-align:center; background:#fbb;"
|67||L||March 15, 2002||2–5 || style="text-align:left;"| @ Florida Panthers (2001–02) ||28–30–8–1 || 
|- style="text-align:center;"
|68||T||March 17, 2002||2–2 OT|| style="text-align:left;"| @ Tampa Bay Lightning (2001–02) ||28–30–9–1 || 
|-  style="text-align:center; background:#cfc;"
|69||W||March 19, 2002||5–1 || style="text-align:left;"|  Ottawa Senators (2001–02) ||29–30–9–1 || 
|-  style="text-align:center; background:#fbb;"
|70||L||March 21, 2002||1–2 || style="text-align:left;"|  Boston Bruins (2001–02) ||29–31–9–1 || 
|-  style="text-align:center; background:#fbb;"
|71||L||March 23, 2002||0–2 || style="text-align:left;"| @ Toronto Maple Leafs (2001–02) ||29–32–9–1 || 
|-  style="text-align:center; background:#cfc;"
|72||W||March 24, 2002||3–2 OT|| style="text-align:left;"| @ Ottawa Senators (2001–02) ||30–32–9–1 || 
|-  style="text-align:center; background:#fbb;"
|73||L||March 26, 2002||3–4 || style="text-align:left;"|  Washington Capitals (2001–02) ||30–33–9–1 || 
|-  style="text-align:center; background:#fbb;"
|74||L||March 28, 2002||1–4 || style="text-align:left;"| @ St. Louis Blues (2001–02) ||30–34–9–1 || 
|-  style="text-align:center; background:#cfc;"
|75||W||March 30, 2002||3–1 || style="text-align:left;"| @ Philadelphia Flyers (2001–02) ||31–34–9–1 || 
|-

|-  style="text-align:center; background:#cfc;"
|76||W||April 1, 2002||3–1 || style="text-align:left;"|  Philadelphia Flyers (2001–02) ||32–34–9–1 || 
|- style="text-align:center;"
|77||T||April 3, 2002||1–1 OT|| style="text-align:left;"|  New York Islanders (2001–02) ||32–34–10–1 || 
|-  style="text-align:center; background:#cfc;"
|78||W||April 5, 2002||3–1 || style="text-align:left;"|  Florida Panthers (2001–02) ||33–34–10–1 || 
|-  style="text-align:center; background:#cfc;"
|79||W||April 7, 2002||5–3 || style="text-align:left;"| @ Tampa Bay Lightning (2001–02) ||34–34–10–1 || 
|- style="text-align:center;"
|80||T||April 10, 2002||4–4 OT|| style="text-align:left;"| @ Pittsburgh Penguins (2001–02) ||34–34–11–1 || 
|-  style="text-align:center; background:#fbb;"
|81||L||April 12, 2002||1–3 || style="text-align:left;"|  Washington Capitals (2001–02) ||34–35–11–1 || 
|-  style="text-align:center; background:#cfc;"
|82||W||April 13, 2002||3–0 || style="text-align:left;"| @ Montreal Canadiens (2001–02) ||35–35–11–1 || 
|-

|-
| Legend:

Player statistics

Scoring
 Position abbreviations: C = Center; D = Defense; G = Goaltender; LW = Left Wing; RW = Right Wing
  = Joined team via a transaction (e.g., trade, waivers, signing) during the season. Stats reflect time with the Sabres only.

Goaltending

Awards and records

Transactions
The Sabres were involved in the following transactions from June 10, 2001, the day after the deciding game of the 2001 Stanley Cup Finals, through June 13, 2002, the day of the deciding game of the 2002 Stanley Cup Finals.

Trades

Players acquired

Players lost

Signings

Draft picks
Buffalo's draft picks at the 2001 NHL Entry Draft held at the National Car Rental Center in Sunrise, Florida.

See also
 2001–02 NHL season

Notes

References

Buff
Buff
Buffalo Sabres seasons
Buffalo
Buffalo